Asghar Zareeinejad is a paralympic athlete and archer from Iran competing mainly in category F40 shot put events.

Asghar competed in Athens in the 2004 Summer Paralympics winning the bronze medal in the F40 shot put.

References

Paralympic athletes of Iran
Athletes (track and field) at the 2004 Summer Paralympics
Paralympic bronze medalists for Iran
Living people
Medalists at the 2004 Summer Paralympics
Year of birth missing (living people)
Paralympic medalists in athletics (track and field)
Iranian male shot putters
Islamic Solidarity Games medalists in archery
21st-century Iranian people